Von Klitzing is a surname. Notable people with the surname include:

George Ernst von Klitzing (1698–1759), Prussian major general
Klaus von Klitzing (born 1943), German physicist